Caperhantus is a genus of predaceous diving beetles in the family Dytiscidae. There is one described species in Caperhantus, C. cicurius. This species was formerly a member of the genus Rhantus.

References

Dytiscidae
Dytiscidae genera
Monotypic Adephaga genera